Wilby may refer to:

Places

Wilby, Norfolk, England
Wilby, Northamptonshire, England
Wilby, Suffolk, England
Wilby, Victoria, Australia
Wilby, Missouri, United States

Surname
 James Wilby (born 1958), actor
 Jane Wilby, pseudonym of Anne Hampson (1928–2014), author
 Jennifer Wilby (born 1953), management scientist
 Peter Wilby (born 1944), UK journalist
 Philip Wilby (born 1949), composer

Fictional
Places
 Wilby, a small Maritime island town where the film Wilby Wonderful takes place
People
 Wilby Xaba in the 1975 film The Wilby Conspiracy
 Wilby Daniels in the 1959 film The Shaggy Dog